Marshallena diomedea is a species of sea snail, a marine gastropod mollusc in the family Marshallenidae.

Description

Distribution
This marine species occurs off Kalimantan, Borneo at depths between 558–567 m.

References

 A.W.B. Powell (1969),  "The family Turridae in the Indo—Pacific. Part 12. The subfamily Turriculinae; Indo-Pacific Mollusca, 2 (10) 207–415
 Sysoev, Alexander. Mollusca Gastropoda: new deep-water turrid gastropods (Conoidea) from eastern Indonesia. Muséum national d'Histoire naturelle, 1997.

External links
 
 Tucker, J.K. 2004 Catalog of recent and fossil turrids (Mollusca: Gastropoda). Zootaxa 682:1–1295.

diomedea
Gastropods described in 1969